Surfer, Dude is a 2008 American comedy film directed by S.R. Bindler and starring Matthew McConaughey.

Woody Harrelson claims the film is the most "non-work" he has ever done. McConaughey and Harrelson, who previously appeared together in EDtv, later co-starred in HBO's True Detective.

Premise
Surfer, Dude is the story of Steve Addington, a soul-searching surfer who experiences an existential crisis when no waves come for over a month. While the waves are not arriving, producers are trying to get him to join a reality show. He refuses joining the show because his main focus is surfing and he keeps searching for the waves along the coast of California. The waves end up coming back a month later.

Cast
 Matthew McConaughey as Steve Addington
 Alexie Gilmore as Danni Martin
 Scott Glenn as Alister Greenbough
 Jeffrey Nordling as Eddie Zarno
 Nathan Phillips as Baker Smith
 Willie Nelson as Farmer Bob
 Woody Harrelson as Jack Mayweather
 Zachary Knighton as Brillo Murphy
 Ramón Rodríguez as Lupe La Rosa
 John Terry as Mercer Martin
 Sarah Wright as Stacey
 Todd Stashwick as Vic Hayes
 Travis Fimmel as Johnny Doran
 K. D. Aubert as April May
Malena Maestas as Jack Mayweather’s Daughter
Anaisa Maestas as Jack Mayweather’s Daughter

Soundtrack
 "Star-Spangled Banner" – Performed by Matthew McConaughey and Blake Neely
 "Mother" – Xavier Rudd
 "Chasing the Dream" – Daniel Heath
 "Thump It" – Daniel Heath
 "Too Far Away" – Potent
 "This Is My Life" – Psideralica
 "Este Amor" (carnival version) – Bermudez Triangle
 "The High" – Deep Sonic
 "No Pants Required" – Nekal B.
 "Too Tired to Quit" – Nekal B.
 "Hip Hop Misfits" – The Dirty Heads
 "Coastline Journey" – Mishka
 "Virgin Lust" – Higore
 "Run and Play" – Potent
 "Come Let Go" – Xavier Rudd
 "Fuk It" – Xavier Rudd
 "3rd Eye Vision" – Mishka

Reception
The film was critically panned upon release. 

At Metacritic the film has an average score of 16 out of 100 based on reviews from 6 critics.

Michael Ordona of the Los Angeles Times stated that "The film is awash in doobies and breasts, clichéd cinematic language and clumsy exposition. It's reminiscent of the stoner-culture movies of the late '60s and early '70s but without the naive fun."
Stephen Farber of The Hollywood Reporter dismissed it as "[A] lackluster vanity production."

References

External links
 Official site 
 
 
 
 

2008 films
2008 comedy films
American independent films
American comedy films
Films scored by Blake Neely
Playtone films
American surfing films
2000s English-language films
2000s American films